Guillermo Cranwell (1841–1909) was an Argentine apothecary and politician, who served as intendant and president of the Deliberative Council of Buenos Aires.

Biography 

Cranwell was born in Buenos Aires, the son of Edmund Cranwell and Dolores Arenillas, belonging to a distinguished family. His father, an Irish Catholic born in Tipperary, and who arrived at the city of Buenos Aires in 1825, was the owner of the "Farmacia Inglesa" (English Pharmacy), one of the first drugstores in the city, located on Reconquista Street, San Nicolás neighborhood.

Guillermo occupied the position of interim mayor of Buenos Aires between August 1888 and May 1889. He also served as inspector of apothecaries of the South Cathedral neighborhood, and in the Deliberative Council of the city, being its president in 1880. 

Guillermo Cranwell was married on March 11, 1871, in the Church of San Miguel Arcángel to Petrona Costa, daughter of Juan Miguel Costa and María Josefa González.

References 

1841 births
1909 deaths
People from Buenos Aires
Argentine people of Spanish descent
Argentine people of Irish descent
Mayors of Buenos Aires
Burials at La Recoleta Cemetery
Río de la Plata